Maeve Clancy is an Irish illustrator and artist working on stage design and graphic novels based out of Dublin.

Life
Clancy worked as a set designer for film and tv. She has also written and illustrated webcomics and theatre plays using paper cut out techniques she developed. In 2018 she was Visual Artist in Residence in Contemporary Drawing at Mary Immaculate College Limerick. She works on commissions such as the installation at the National Trust site, Barrington Court, completed while she was the artist in residence there as well as that done at St John the Baptist Boys National School in Clontarf, Dublin.

References

Living people
21st-century Irish women artists
Alumni of the National College of Art and Design
Irish comics artists
Irish female comics artists
Irish illustrators
Irish women illustrators
Irish film people
Irish television people
People associated with the University of Limerick
Set designers
Irish webcomic creators
Year of birth missing (living people)